Impuros is a Brazilian crime drama television series produced by The Walt Disney Company Latin America in association with Barry Company and directed by Tomás Portella and René Sampaio. The first season was released on October 19, 2018 on Fox Premium. The second season was released on November 8, 2019. The third season was released on August 31, 2021 on Star+.

Premise
Based on real events and set in the 1990s, Impuros follows the story of Evandro do Dendê, leader of one of the largest criminal factions in the periphery of Rio de Janeiro, and police Morello, a self-destructive veteran, who will seek vengeance at all costs. Two violent men, strategists, cold, respected by their followers and sharing the love for war.

Cast and characters
 Raphael Logam as Evandro
 Rui Ricardo Dias as Morello
 Cyria Coentro as Arlete
  as Salvador
 Fernanda Machado as Andreia
 Flávio Bauraqui as Adilson
 Roco Pitanga as Bruninho Bagdá
 João Vitor Silva as ustavo
 Cadu Favero as Brito
 Peter Brandão  as Hermes
 Sérgio Malheiros as Wilbert
 Leandro Firmino as Gilmar
 Lorena Comparato as Geise
 Gillrray Coutinho as Dr. Burgos
 Vinícius Patrício as Bahiano / Juninho
 Karize Brum as Inês
 César Troncoso as Neves
 Jean Pierre Noher as Charles
 Germán Palacios as Arturo Urquiza
 Julieta Zylberberg as Pilar
 Antônio Carlos as Zeca

Reception

Awards and nominations

International Emmy Award

References

External links
 

2010s Brazilian television series
2018 Brazilian television series debuts
Brazilian crime television series
Brazilian drama television series
Brazilian prison television series
Portuguese-language television shows
Television shows set in Rio de Janeiro (city)
Television shows set in Bolivia
Television shows set in Paraguay
Television shows about drugs
Television series set in the 1990s
Works about organized crime in Brazil
Star+ original programming